The sport climbing events  at the 2009 World Games in Kaohsiung was played between 18 and 19 July. 43 athletes, from 17 nations, participated in the tournament. The competition took place in Shoushan Junior High School.

Participating nations

Medal table

Medals summary

Men

Women

References

External links
 International Federation of Sport Climbing
 Sport climbing on IWGA website
 Results
 Competition schedule

2009 World Games
Sport climbing at the 2009 World Games
2009
2009 in sport climbing